Antonio Restelli (June 1877 – March 1945) was an Italian cyclist. He competed in the men's sprint event at the 1900 Summer Olympics.

References

External links
 

1877 births
1945 deaths
Italian male cyclists
Olympic cyclists of Italy
Cyclists at the 1900 Summer Olympics
Place of birth missing
Cyclists from Milan
Date of birth missing
Date of death missing